G111 may refer to:
 China National Highway 111
 a painting of the William Rush and His Model series by Thomas Eakins

G-111 may refer to :
 G-111 (originally SA-16A), a USAF version of the HU-16 Albatross flying boat